Halgerda xishaensis is a species of sea slug, a dorid nudibranch, shell-less marine gastropod mollusks in the family Discodorididae.

Distribution 
This species was described from the intertidal zone of the Xisha Islands, China.

References

Discodorididae
Gastropods described in 1975